Podayva Glacier is the 4.5 km long and 3 km wide glacier on Pasteur Peninsula, Brabant Island in the Palmer Archipelago, Antarctica, situated northeast of Dodelen Glacier and west of Burevestnik Glacier.  It drains the north slopes of Stribog Mountains, flows northwards and enters the sea east of Cape Roux and west of Marinka Point.

The glacier is named after the settlement of Podayva in Northeastern Bulgaria.

Location
British mapping in 1980 and 2008.

See also
 List of glaciers in the Antarctic
 Glaciology

Maps
 Antarctic Digital Database (ADD). Scale 1:250000 topographic map of Antarctica. Scientific Committee on Antarctic Research (SCAR). Since 1993, regularly upgraded and updated.
British Antarctic Territory. Scale 1:200000 topographic map. DOS 610 Series, Sheet W 64 62. Directorate of Overseas Surveys, Tolworth, UK, 1980.
Brabant Island to Argentine Islands. Scale 1:250000 topographic map. British Antarctic Survey, 2008.

References
 Bulgarian Antarctic Gazetteer. Antarctic Place-names Commission. (details in Bulgarian, basic data in English)
 Podayva Glacier. SCAR Composite Antarctic Gazetteer.

External links
 Podayva Glacier. Copernix satellite image

Glaciers of the Palmer Archipelago
Bulgaria and the Antarctic
Brabant Island